Edmilson Carlos Abel (Ferraz de Vasconcelos born 23 February 1974) is a Brazilian footballer who last played as a midfielder for Veranópolis.

Club statistics

External links

Kawasaki Frontale

1974 births
Living people
Brazilian footballers
Brazilian expatriate footballers
J2 League players
Kawasaki Frontale players
Clube Atlético Juventus players
Mirassol Futebol Clube players
Esporte Clube Juventude players
Avaí FC players
Esporte Clube Santo André players
Sport Club Internacional players
Marília Atlético Clube players
Grêmio Foot-Ball Porto Alegrense players
Criciúma Esporte Clube players
Clube Atlético Linense players
Rio Branco Esporte Clube players
Expatriate footballers in Japan
Association football midfielders
Brazilian expatriate sportspeople in Japan
People from Ferraz de Vasconcelos